Rhyscotidae is a family of woodlice (suborder Oniscidea), terrestrial crustaceans of the  order Isopoda.

Genera
The family Rhyscotidae comprises the following two genera:
Rhyscotoides
Rhyscotus

References

External links

Woodlice
Crustacean families